Mɔɔ or Mọọ, known as Gomu (Gwomu) after its location, is a Bikwin (Adamawa) language spoken by about 5,000 people in Taraba State, Nigeria.

References

Languages of Nigeria
Bambukic languages